Small spiny rat may refer to several different rat species:
Maxomys baeodon from Borneo
Rattus steini from New Guinea

Animal common name disambiguation pages